Luperini may refer to:

 Luperini (beetle), a tribe of leaf beetles
 Fabiana Luperini (born 1974), Italian cyclist
 Gregorio Luperini (born 1994), Italian footballer